Giulio Saraudi (3 July 1938 – 20 April 2005) was an Italian boxer, and an Olympic bronze medalist. In 1961, he held 49 titles and a line of 45 bouts, whom he won 37 .

Biography
Giulio Saraudi was born to Carlo Saraudi, a light heavyweight boxer who finished fourth at the 1924 Olympics. Giulio's younger brother Vittorio was also an elite light heavyweight boxer.

Giulio Saraudi won the light heavyweight bronze medal at the 1960 Olympic Games, behind Muhammad Ali (then known as Cassius Clay) and Zbigniew Pietrzykowski. Saraudi did not fight Clay, he lost to Pietrzykowski in a semifinal. At the European championships Saraudi won a gold medal in 1961 and a bronze in 1959. He turned professional in 1965, moving from light heavyweight to heavyweight, and was undefeated in his first twelve bouts before losing a decision to Johnny Prescott in 1967.  He retired in 1968.

Olympic Results
Giulio Saraudi's results from the 1960 Olympic boxing tournament in the light heavyweight division:

 Round of 32: bye
 Round of 16: defeated Muhammad Safdar of Pakistan by decision, 5-0
 Quarterfinal: defeated Rafael Gargiulo of Argentina by decision, 5-0
 Semifinal: lost to Zbigniew Pietrzykowski of Poland, 0-5 (awarded bronze medal as a defeated semifinalist)

Professional boxing record

|-
|align="center" colspan=8|9 Wins (4 knockouts, 5 decisions), 1 Loss (1 decision), 3 Draws, 1 No Contest
|-
| align="center" style="border-style: none none solid solid; background: #e3e3e3"|Result
| align="center" style="border-style: none none solid solid; background: #e3e3e3"|Record
| align="center" style="border-style: none none solid solid; background: #e3e3e3"|Opponent
| align="center" style="border-style: none none solid solid; background: #e3e3e3"|Type
| align="center" style="border-style: none none solid solid; background: #e3e3e3"|Round
| align="center" style="border-style: none none solid solid; background: #e3e3e3"|Date
| align="center" style="border-style: none none solid solid; background: #e3e3e3"|Location
|-align=center
|Win
|
|align=left| Roosevelt Eddie
|PTS
|8
|19 January 1968
|align=left| Palazzetto dello Sport, Rome, Lazio
|-
|Loss
|
|align=left| Johnny Prescott
|PTS
|10
|24 April 1967
|align=left| Nottingham Ice Stadium, Nottingham, Nottinghamshire
|-
|Win
|
|align=left| Valere Mahau
|PTS
|8
|16 March 1967
|align=left| Bologna, Emilia-Romagna
|-
|Draw
|
|align=left| Remington Dyantyi
|PTS
|8
|19 January 1967
|align=left| Land Rover Arena, Bologna, Emilia-Romagna
|-
|No contest
|
|align=left| Giulio Rinaldi
|NC
|5
|2 December 1966
|align=left| Palazzetto dello Sport, Rome, Lazio
|-
|Win
|
|align=left| Juergen Blin
|PTS
|8
|23 September 1966
|align=left| Palazzetto dello Sport, Rome, Lazio
|-
|Win
|
|align=left| Horst Benedens
|PTS
|8
|14 May 1966
|align=left| Deutschlandhalle, Charlottenburg, Berlin
|-
|Draw
|
|align=left| Leweni Waqa
|PTS
|8
|4 February 1966
|align=left| Palazzetto dello Sport, Rome, Lazio
|-
|Draw
|
|align=left| Renato Moraes
|PTS
|8
|15 October 1965
|align=left| Palazzetto dello Sport, Rome, Lazio
|-
|Win
|
|align=left| Jose Angel Manzur
|TKO
|6
|10 September 1965
|align=left| Palasport di San Siro, Milan, Lombardy
|-
|Win
|
|align=left| Siegfried Gross
|TKO
|2
|23 April 1965
|align=left| Bologna, Emilia-Romagna
|-
|Win
|
|align=left| Basilio Cominardi
|PTS
|6
|24 March 1965
|align=left| Rome, Lazio
|-
|Win
|
|align=left| Mohamed Sahib
|TKO
|4
|27 February 1965
|align=left| Palasport di San Siro, Milan, Lombardy
|-
|Win
|
|align=left| Alberto Grandolini
|TKO
|3
|22 January 1965
|align=left| Palazzetto dello Sport, Rome, Lazio
|}

References

1938 births
2005 deaths
Light-heavyweight boxers
Olympic boxers of Italy
People from Civitavecchia
Boxers at the 1960 Summer Olympics
Olympic bronze medalists for Italy
Olympic medalists in boxing
Italian male boxers
Medalists at the 1960 Summer Olympics
Sportspeople from the Metropolitan City of Rome Capital
20th-century Italian people